Macas may refer to:

Macas (city), the capital city of the province of Morona Santiago in Ecuador
Macas Airport, airport near Macas, Ecuador
Luis Macas (born 1951), Kichwa politician and intellectual from Saraguro, Ecuador
Arvydas "Macas" Macijauskas (born 1980), Lithuanian basketball player

See also 
MACA (disambiguation)